Thomas Million John Turpin (November 18, 1871 – August 13, 1922) was an African American composer of ragtime music.

Tom Turpin was born in Savannah, Georgia, a son of John L. Turpin and Lulu Waters Turpin.  In his early twenties he opened a saloon in St. Louis, Missouri which became a meeting-place for local pianists and an incubation point for early folk ragtime, such as musician Joe Jordan. Turpin himself is credited with the first published rag by an African-American, his "Harlem Rag" of 1897 (it was composed by 1892, a year before ragtime's introduction to the world at the 1893 Worlds Fair).  His other published rags include "Bowery Buck," "Ragtime Nightmare," "St. Louis Rag," and "The Buffalo Rag".

Turpin was a large man, six feet (1.83 m) tall and 300 pounds (136 kg); his piano had to be raised on blocks so that he could play it standing up, otherwise his stomach would get in the way. In addition to his saloon-keeping duties and his ragtime composition, he controlled (with his brother Charles) a theater, gambling houses, dance halls, and sporting houses.  He served as a deputy constable and was one of the first politically powerful African-Americans in St. Louis.  His influence on local music earned him the title "Father of St. Louis Ragtime."

Date
Turpin's date of birth is uncertain; both 1871 and 1873 appear in published sources.  His gravestone says simply 1871.  The 1900 Federal Census for the city of St. Louis (Enumeration District 220, Sheet 9, Line 79) listed his birthdate as "November 1871", but on his draft registration card he wrote November 18, 1874. However, some historians believe he was born in 1873.

See also
List of ragtime composers

References

External links

St. Louis Rag audio recording from the Library of Congress jukebox
The Buffalo Rag audio recording from the Library of Congress jukebox

1871 births
1922 deaths
African-American composers
African-American male composers
Drinking establishment owners
Ragtime composers
Writers from Savannah, Georgia
20th-century African-American people